Bing & Grøndahl was a Danish porcelain manufacturer founded in 1853 by the sculptor Frederik Vilhelm Grøndahl and merchant brothers Meyer Hermann Bing and Jacob Herman Bing. The trademark backstamp for Bing & Grøndahl (B&G) porcelains is the three towers derived from the Coat of Arms of Copenhagen. The company's Seagull dinnerware series became known as the "National Service of Denmark"  in the 1950s when it was found in one tenth of all Danish households. In 1987 the company merged with its primary competitor, the Royal Porcelain Factory under the name Royal Copenhagen.

History
Bing & Grøndahl was founded on 15 April 1853 by Grøndahl, who was a figurine maker for the Royal Danish Porcelain Factory, and the Bing brothers, who were art and book dealers. The factory was located on the corner of Vesterbrogade and Rahbek Allé in the Vesterbro area, at that time outside the city of Copenhagen, Denmark. Grøndahl initially began the company to produce biscuit porcelain figurines modeled on the neoclassical sculptures of Bertel Thorvaldsen. The company extended production to include elegant tableware and coffee sets.

The company's signature design, Seagull, was created in 1892 by designer Fanny Garde (1855-1925). The modest, classic design features flying seagulls against pale blue backgrounds, sea horse handles and shaded patterns of scales around the edges. Due to its popularity from the 1950s to the 1980s, the Seagull design was considered the "National Service of Denmark". During that period one out of every ten Danish households owned some of the dinnerware service.

In 1895, Bing & Grøndahl created the first in their series of Christmas plates. Designed with a traditional winter scene in cobalt blue and white, the plates have been released annually for more than 100 years. Noted as desirable by collectors, this series became responsible for a large portion of the company's production.

In 1987 the company merged with its primary competitor, the Royal Porcelain Factory under the name Royal Copenhagen.

The tea service designed by Gertrud Vasegaard in 1956 was included in the Danish Culture Canon as a masterpiece of Danish design.

Associated people

Artistic directors
 1853-1868 Andreas Juuel
 1868-1890 Heinrich Hansen
 1885-1892 Pietro Krohn (later board member)
 1897-1900 J.F. Willumsen

Other artists
 August Hallin
 Siegfried Wagner, sculptor
 Kai Nielsen, sculptor
 Jean René Gauguin
 Fanny Garde
 Effie Hegermann-Lindencorne
 Hans Tegner
 Carl Petersen
 H.O. Busch-Jensen

Notes

References
Engelstoft, Poul  Porcelænsfabrikken Bing & Grøndahl 1853-1928 (Poul Engelstoft og J.H. Bing). Ill. Kbh. 1928, 90pp
Minardi, Robin Hecht, "Scandinavian Art Pottery: Denmark and Sweden", Schiffer Publishing Ltd., Rev. 2nd Ed., 2005, p. 36-46, 
Owen, Pat,Story of Bing and Grondahl Christmas Plates, Viking Import House, 1985, 
Owen, Pat, Bing and Grondahl Christmas Plates: The First Hundred Years, Landfall Press, 1995, 255pp, 
 
 
Zahle, Erik, Bing and Grondahl, 1853-1953, Danish Museum of Decorative Art, 1953

External links 

 
Bing & Grondahl factory marks 1853 to 2003, The Art of Dating Bing & Grondahl, www.jamiri.dk
 Source

Ceramics manufacturers of Denmark
Royal Copenhagen
Danish porcelain
Purveyors to the Court of Denmark
Danish companies established in 1853